Posyolok imeni Vorovskogo is a rural locality (a settlement) in Moshokskoye Rural Settlement, Sudogodsky District, Vladimir Oblast, Russia. The population was 2,048 as of 2010. There are 18 streets.

Geography 
The settlement is located 45 km southeast of Sudogda (the district's administrative centre) by road. Yazvitsy is the nearest rural locality.

References 

Rural localities in Sudogodsky District
Sudogodsky Uyezd